The qualification for the UEFA Women's Euro 2005 was held between March 26, 2003 & November 27, 2004. The first-placed of the group stage qualified directly. The second-placed and the two best third-placed teams played in two playoff matches for three other berths. England qualified as host.

First Category
England qualified automatically as hosts for the final tournament.

Group 1

Sweden qualified for the final tournament.

Italy and Finland advanced for the playoff.

Group 2

Denmark qualified for the final tournament.

Norway advanced for the playoff.

Group 3

France qualified for the final tournament.

Russia and Iceland advanced for the playoff.

Group 4

Germany qualified for the final tournament.

Czech Republic advanced for the playoff.

Second Category

Group 5

Group 6

Wales withdrew.

Group 7

Playoff

|}

First leg

Second leg

Finland won 4–1 on aggregate.

Norway won 9–3 on aggregate.

Italy won 5–1 on aggregate.

Finland, Norway and Italy qualified for the final tournament.

Top goalscorers

External links
2003–05 UEFA Women's EURO at UEFA.com
Tables & results at RSSSF.com

Qual
Women
UEFA Women's Championship qualification
UEFA
UEFA